Bill Boulware is an American producer and screenwriter. He was the creator of the sitcom television series 227 along with Michael G. Moye. Boulware produced and wrote for television programs including, The Parkers, Cosby, New Attitude, Benson, Drexell's Class, One on One,  and The Fresh Prince of Bel-Air.

References

External links 

Living people
Place of birth missing (living people)
Year of birth missing (living people)
American male screenwriters
American television writers
American male television writers
American television producers
20th-century American screenwriters
20th-century American male writers